Our Lady's College, founded in 1953, is an aided girls school affiliated with the Daughters of Help of Christians. It is currently located at 3 Lung Fung Street in Kowloon East, Hong Kong. It uses English as the medium of instruction.

Mission statement
 Promote whole-person education to foster students' moral and academic development.
 Provide a great variety of extra-curricular activities to enrich their school life.
 Emphasize home-school co-operation to help students develop their positive values.

History

Facilities

Class structure

School Uniform and accessories
 Hair accessories: Black, white and blue colours only.
 S.1-S.2:  the school badge is pink in colour
 S.3-S.6:  the school badge is blue in colour

Students' Association
The aims of the Students' Association are to enhance communication between the school and the students, promote the interface of the students and strengthen the sense of unity among students. Moreover, students are encouraged to participate actively in extra-curricular activities and community service. Committee members include representatives of all levels.

School Press
School Press is in its 22nd year. Each year, it publishes three issues of Our Ladian. By the effort of its members, it provides schoolmates with interesting news about the school and the world.

Houses
 Faith House
 Hope House
 Love House
 Wisdom House

See also
Education in Hong Kong
List of secondary schools in Hong Kong

References

External links

 Our Lady's College - Official Homepage
 Our Lady's Primary School - Official Homepage
 Our Lady's College Alumni - Official Homepage 
 Our Lady's College Wikimapia

Girls' schools in Hong Kong
Catholic secondary schools in Hong Kong
Roman Catholic primary schools in Hong Kong